Gudmund Sundby (18 January 1878 – 16 February 1973) was a Norwegian hydroelectric engineer and university professor.

Biography
Sundby was born at Ullensaker in Akershus, Norway.  He was a son of  Halvor Gudmundsen Sundby and Gina Jakobsdatter. He was a student at Kristiania Technical School (today a part of Oslo University College) and  took the mechanical engineering exam in 1898, after which he was employed by Kværner. He went on a study trip to the United States from 1904 and completed a course of study during 1907 in  Switzerland and Italy. Sundby developed an automatic turbine regulator that was patented in 1909. He served as chief engineer for the turbine department at Kværner from 1905 to 1912.

He was appointed professor of hydroelectricity at the Norwegian Institute of Technology from 1911 to 1952. He was also managing director the Hydroelectric Laboratory at the university which was completed in 1917.

Sundby was a member of the Royal Norwegian Society of Sciences and Letters from 1928. He was decorated Knight, First Class of the Order of St. Olav in 1949. A portrait of Sundby, painted by Jean Heiberg, is located at the Norwegian University of Science and Technology.

References

1878 births
1973 deaths
People from Ullensaker
Oslo University College alumni
Norwegian engineers
Hydroelectric engineers
Academic staff of the Norwegian University of Science and Technology
Royal Norwegian Society of Sciences and Letters
Recipients of the St. Olav's Medal